Albert Shibura (born 1939) is a Burundian retired politician and military officer.

Early life 
Albert Shibura was born in 1939 in the Matana region of the present Bururi Province, Ruanda-Urundi. After six years of primary education he attended the Groupe Scolaire de Astrida. He subsequently attended Lovanium University in the Belgian Congo before failing out of his classes. Shibura later studied in Munich, West Germany before enrolling at the École spéciale militaire de Saint-Cyr.

Career 
After two years of study at Saint-Cyr, Shibura returned to Burundi in 1965 and was commissioned as a second lieutenant in the Burundi National Army.

From 1967 to July 15, 1972 he was chief of staff of the Military of Burundi.
From 15 July 1972 to 5 June 1973 he was Minister of Interior and Justice in the administration of Albin Nyamoya.
From 5 June 1973 to 1975 he was the first Burundian ambassador in Beijing with accreditation in Pyongyang.
From 1980 to 1981 he was ambassador in Kampala.

References

Works cited 
 

1939 births
Living people
Ambassadors of Burundi to China
Ambassadors of Burundi to Uganda
Justice ministers of Burundi
Interior ministers of Burundi
Tutsi people
Hema people
People from Bururi Province